Korpusta (Kärpäste) is a rural locality (a village) in Inzersky Selsoviet, Beloretsky District, Bashkortostan, Russia. The population was 11 as of 2010. There are 2 streets.

Geography 
Korpusta is located 110 km northwest of Beloretsk (the district's administrative centre) by road. Alexandrovka is the nearest rural locality.

References 

Rural localities in Beloretsky District